Meierijstad is a municipality in the province of North Brabant. The municipality is the result of a merger between the municipalities Schijndel, Sint-Oedenrode and Veghel in 2017. After the merger it became the largest municipality in terms of land area of North Brabant (surpassed by Altena in 2019). The town of Veghel hosts the town hall, while the municipal council holds its meetings at the former town hall of Sint-Oedenrode.

Population centres

Topography 

Dutch topographic map of the municipality of Meierijstad, 2020

Notable people 
 Hendrik Herp (died 1477) a Dutch or Flemish Franciscan and a writer on mysticism 
 Pieter de Josselin de Jong (1861 in Sint-Oedenrode – 1906) a Dutch painter from North Brabant
 Lou Tellegen (born 1881 in Sint-Oedenrode – 1934) a Dutch stage and film actor, film director and screenwriter 
 Ton Smits (1921 in Vegheland - 1981) a Dutch cartoonist and comic artist
 Els Coppens-van de Rijt (born 1943 in Sint-Oedenrode) an artist and author from Vlierden
 Anton Berns (born 1945 in Schijndel) a Dutch scientist researching molecular genetics
 Hein Van de Geyn (born 1956 in Schijndel) a jazz double bassist, composer and band leader 
 Winy Maas (born 1959 in Schijndel) a Dutch architect, landscape architect, professor and urbanist
 Nikki Kerkhof (born 1983 in Sint-Oedenrode) a Dutch pop singer
 Sophie Bongers (born 1998) stage name Sophie Francis, a Dutch record producer, DJ and musician, brought up in Sint-Oedenrode

Sport 

 Wiljan Vloet (born 1962 in Schijndel) a Dutch football manager
 Monique Kalkman-Van Den Bosch (born 1964 in Sint-Oedenrode) a Dutch wheelchair tennis player
 Eric Verhagen (born 1964 in Schijndel) a retired Dutch sidecarcross passenger and double World Champion. 
 Rein van Duijnhoven (born 1967 in Veghel) is a former football goalkeeper with over 500 club caps
 Anky van Grunsven (born 1968 in Erp) a Dutch dressage champion with nine Olympic medals from seven successive games
 Jack de Gier (born 1968 in Schijndel) a Dutch former footballer with over 400 club caps and current manager of Go Ahead Eagles
 Earnie Stewart (born 1969 in Veghel) an American retired soccer player with 474 club caps and the sporting director of U.S. Soccer
 Stefan Jansen (born 1972 in Veghel) a former football striker with over 330 club caps
 Dillianne van den Boogaard (born 1974 in Veghel) a former Dutch field hockey defender, twice team bronze medallist in the 1996 and 2000 Summer Olympics
 Theo Lucius (born 1976 in Veghel) is a Dutch former footballer with 402 club caps
 Marloes Keetels (born 1993 in Schijndel) a Dutch field hockey player, team silver medallist at the 2016 Summer Olympics

References

External links

 
Municipalities of North Brabant
Municipalities of the Netherlands established in 2017